Fernando Ulises Adame de León (born 27 June 1959) is a Mexican politician affiliated with the National Regeneration Movement. As of 2014 he served as Deputy of the LIX Legislature of the Mexican Congress representing Durango as a member of the Institutional Revolutionary Party.
In 2017, Adame de León joined Morena. In 2018, he sought to become the rector of the Universidad Autónoma Agraria Antonio Narro.

References

1959 births
Living people
Politicians from Durango
People from San Juan de Guadalupe Municipality
Institutional Revolutionary Party politicians
Members of the Chamber of Deputies (Mexico) for Durango
Morena (political party) politicians
Members of the Congress of Durango
Universidad Autónoma Agraria Antonio Narro alumni
Autonomous University of Coahuila alumni
Instituto Politécnico Nacional alumni
Academic staff of Universidad Autónoma Agraria Antonio Narro
Academic staff of the Autonomous University of Coahuila
Academic staff of the Instituto Politécnico Nacional
Deputies of the LIX Legislature of Mexico